Sally Aitken is an Australian documentary film and television director, writer and producer. She has been nominated for two Emmys: in 2018 at the International Emmy Award for Best Arts Programming for the documentary film David Stratton: A Cinematic Life, and at the 43rd News and Documentary Emmy Awards for the documentary Playing With Sharks in 2022.

Career

Aitken is known for her work on the documentaries Playing with Sharks: The Valerie Taylor Story, David Stratton: A Cinematic Life, Streets of Your Town and The Week the Women Went.

In 2022, she founded the production company Sam Content alongside Aline Jacques.

 she is in post-production for her upcoming documentary feature, Hot Potato: The Story of the Wiggles, for Amazon Prime Video.

Filmography

Awards and nominations

References

External links
 

Living people
Australian women screenwriters
Australian documentary film directors
Women documentary filmmakers
Year of birth missing (living people)